was a politician and bureaucrat in late Meiji and early Taishō period Empire of Japan. In 1907, he was raised to the rank and title of danshaku (baron) under the kazoku peerage system.

Early life 

The Ōura family was hereditary retainers to a branch of the Shimazu clan of Satsuma Domain. As a Satsuma samurai, Ōura Kanetaka participated in the Boshin War and the suppression of the Ōuetsu Reppan Dōmei during the Meiji Restoration. Under the new Meiji government, he joined the fledgling Japanese police force, working his way up through the ranks until he became Assistant Police Inspector of the Tokyo Metropolitan Police Department. In this capacity, he was field commander of the police forces sent to assist the fledgling Imperial Japanese Army in suppressing his fellow Satsuma countrymen in the Satsuma Rebellion.

Political career
After serving as appointed governor of Shimane Prefecture (1893–1895), Yamaguchi Prefecture (1895–1896), Kumamoto Prefecture (1896–1898) and Miyazaki Prefecture (1898), Ōura was appointed Superintendent General of the Police, and was given a seat in the House of Peers of the Diet of Japan. One of his proposals while in charge of the police was to relocate impoverished residents of central Osaka to a new planned town in the outskirts, on the theory that poverty was the cause of disease and crime. The plan failed due to strong local opposition.
In 1903, under the 1st Katsura administration, Ōura became Minister of Communications. He then served as Minister of Agriculture and Commerce under the 2nd Katsura cabinet and was also chairman of the Japanese committee organizing the Japan–British Exhibition. He subsequently served as Home Minister under the 3rd Katsura cabinet and as both Minister of Agriculture and Trade and Home Minister under the 2nd Ōkuma administration.

Ōura scandal
In December 1914, while in the Ōkuma administration, Ōura was accused of perpetrating voting fraud in the Diet by bribing minor political party and undecided members to influence passage of a military spending bill introduced by Ōkuma to fund two new infantry divisions for the Imperial Japanese Army. A long-time associate of Katsura, Ōura was one of the founding members and leaders of the Rikken Dōshikai political party, and used his position as Home Minister to influence the 1915 General Election in favor the party. Both issues resulted in an upsurge in public criticism from the press and opposition parties, leading to his resignation from the Cabinet in 1915. This incident came to be known as the Ōura scandal.

Later life
In his final years, Ōura served as chairman of the Dai Nippon Butoku Kai.

Ōura died in 1918 at the age of 68.

Notes

References 

 Lebra-Chapman, Joyce. Okuma Shigenobu: statesman of Meiji Japan. Australian National University Press (1973). 

 Mochizuki, Kotarō. (1910) Japan To-day. A Souvenir of the Anglo-Japanese Exhibition held in London, 1910. Tokyo: Liberal News Agency. OCLC 5327867
 Oka Yoshitake, et al. Five Political Leaders of Modern Japan: Ito Hirobumi, Okuma Shigenobu, Hara Takashi, Inukai Tsuyoshi, and Saionji Kimmochi. University of Tokyo Press (1984).

External links

National Diet Library Bio and Photo

1850 births
1918 deaths
Politicians from Kagoshima Prefecture
Shimazu retainers
People of the Boshin War
People of Meiji-period Japan
Government ministers of Japan
Members of the House of Peers (Japan)
Kazoku
Ministers of Home Affairs of Japan
Governors of Kumamoto Prefecture
Rikken Dōshikai politicians
20th-century Japanese politicians
Place of death missing
Governors of Yamaguchi Prefecture
Governors of Miyagi Prefecture
Governors of Shimane Prefecture
People of the Satsuma Rebellion
Recipients of the Order of the Plum Blossom